Instruktsiya po Vyzhivaniyu (Instructions for Survival in English) are a Russian rock band from Tyumen, formed in 1985 by Miroslav Nemirov.

History 
The band was formed in 1985 by Miroslav Nemirov. At their first gig, the KGB declared them to be fascists and expelled them from the Komsomol and sent them to the army. Initially, they played punk rock, but their style changed to alternative rock in 1991, around the time lead singer Roman Neumoev converted to Orthodox Christianity. In 1987, they were involved with the collective Instruktsiya po Oborone. However, Neumoev and Yegor Letov, the leader of Grazhdanskaya Oborona, did not get along well and often quarreled over political views. Grazhdanskaya Oborona's song "Society Pamyat," though primarily meant as a criticism of the right-wing group of the same name, was likely a reference to Instruktsiya po Vyzhivaniyu's album Pamyat and doubly-intended as a criticism of Neumoev's antisemitic views. In 1993, they joined the Russky Proryv movement.

Their latest album, Armageddon Pozadi!, is being funded by a Boomstarter (Russian equivalent of Kickstarter or Pozible) page.

Their most controversial song is "Ubit zhida" (Kill the Jew) from 1991. Neumoev has stated that the song is not antisemitic, but a Biblical reference, and that he will not play the song on Victory Day, because he feels the day is both for Russians and Jews. Neumoev had changed Nemirov's original lyrics ("kill a bull, to collect his gun") to "kill a Jew, to buy a gun," at a 1991 music festival in Moscow. Nemirov disagreed with Neumoev's changes and this incident led to his departure from the band.

The band is on the Anti Defamation League's "Bigots who Rock" list.

Discography 
 Nochnoi bit (1986)
 Konfrontatsiya v Moskve (1988)
 Vnimanie (1991)
 Pamyat (1991)
 Smertnoe (1992)
 Armia Belogo Sveta (1992)
 Religia Serdca (1994)
 Zvezdnoe nebo (1998)
 Shchetochki (1999)
 Za chistoe nebo nad golovoi (2000)
 Rex (2002)
 Slava lyubvi (2006)
 Zvezdy ne umirayut (2007)
 Solnechny Krest (2008)
 Armageddon Pozadi (2014)

References

External links 
 Official site
 Boomstarter page on Armageddon pozadi
 Instruktsiya po Vyzhivaniyu at Discogs

Russian rock music groups
Musical groups established in 1985
Soviet rock music groups
1985 establishments in the Soviet Union